Dennis Housden (born 15 March 1953) was an English professional association footballer of the 1970s. He was born in Islington, and played in the Football League for Gillingham, making 16 appearances.

References

External links
 
 Dennis Housden at Margate Football Club History

1953 births
Living people
Footballers from Islington (district)
English footballers
Association football forwards
Gillingham F.C. players
English Football League players